Darreh-ye Salb (also Romanized as Darreh-ye Şalb and Darreh Salb) is a village in Mishan Rural District, Mahvarmilani District, Mamasani County, Fars Province, Iran. At the 2006 census, its population was 74, in 15 families.

References 

Populated places in Mamasani County